Farm to Market Road 400 (FM 400) is a farm to market road located in Lynn, Lubbock, Hale, and Swisher counties in the Llano Estacado of Texas.

Route description
The southern terminus of FM 400 is at an interchange with  US 87 north of the Tahoka city limits. The route travels to the northeast through rural areas of Lynn County, passing to the west of Tahoka Lake and through Wilson along that city's 10th Street before entering Lubbock County. In Slaton, FM 400 turns to the north and crosses  US 84 near the southern city limits before entering that city's downtown, where it is concurrent with  Bus. The route leaves Slaton and continues north along Vetch Avenue, passing to the east of Slaton Airport, then descending into and climbing out of Yellow House Canyon, to the east of the community of Ransom Canyon. The next major intersection is just east of Idalou, with  US 62 / US 82 / SH 114. The highway crosses  US 70 and then briefly turns to the east along 24th Street before resuming its northward journey. FM 400 has a brief concurrency with FM 788 in northern Hale County; after the two routes separate, FM 400 enters Swisher County, and reaches its northern terminus at  FM 145 east of Kress.

History
FM 400 was originally designated on June 25, 1945; its original routing was exclusively in Lubbock County, from Idalou northward to the Hale County line. On July 9 of that same year saw an extension northward, into Hale County and to a junction with FM 54 west of Petersburg. The road was lengthened, this time to the south, on December 16, 1948, from Idalou to a county road just north of the Slaton Airport ( south of Idalou). On March 19, 1949, a southern section of FM 400 was designated, replacing  FM 1074. This southern section was in Lynn County, and ran southward from the Lubbock County line through Wilson to  US 87. This created a gap in the routing of FM 400 in and around Slaton; this gap would be closed on May 23, 1951, when the two sections of FM 400 were both extended to connect with US 84 at two different points in Slaton. The route was extended northward to Plainview on January 27, 1950. It was extended north to the FM 145 on February 24, 1953, replacing the section of FM 788 from US 70 north to the junction of FM 788 and FM 400 and all of FM 2078; this created the concurrency with FM 788, which TxDOT officially considers a gap in that route's mileage. On April 24, 1953, the section from FM 145 to the Swisher county line was cancelled, but would be reinstated on October 29, 1953.  The route designation was amended in 1965 after the US 84 freeway bypass south of Slaton was constructed; the old location of US 84 was renumbered Loop 251, which would eventually be redesignated as Business US 84 in 1991.

Major intersections

See also
 Becton, Texas
 Farm to Market Road 669
 Heckville, Texas
 Idalou, Texas

Notes

References

External links

0400
Transportation in Lynn County, Texas
Transportation in Lubbock County, Texas
Transportation in Hale County, Texas
Transportation in Swisher County, Texas